is a passenger railway station located in the city of Chigasaki, Kanagawa Prefecture, Japan, operated by the East Japan Railway Company (JR East).

Lines

Station layout
The station consists of a single island platform connected to a small station building by a footbridge. The station is staffed.

History
It assumed its present name on June 1, 1944, when the Sagami Railway was nationalized and merged with the Japan National Railways. Freight services were discontinued from November 1986. On April 1, 1987, with the dissolution and privatization of the Japan National Railways, the station came under the operation of JR East. Automated turnstiles using the Suica IC card system came into operation from November 2001.

Passenger statistics
In fiscal 2019, the station was used by an average of 2,870 passengers daily (boarding passengers only).

The passenger figures (boarding passengers only) for previous years are as shown below.

Surrounding area
Chigasaki Municipal Hospital
Kanagawa Prefectural Tsurumine High School
Toho Titanium / Chigasaki Factory
AGC Seimi Chemical / Chigasaki Factory
Tokai Carbon Shonan Factory

See also
List of railway stations in Japan

References

External links

JR East Station Information

Railway stations in Japan opened in 1940
Railway stations in Kanagawa Prefecture
Sagami Line
Chigasaki, Kanagawa